Nairnshire was a constituency of the Parliament of Scotland before the Union with England in 1707. The barons of the shire or sheriffdom of Nairn elected two commissioners to represent them in the Parliament and in the Convention of Estates.

At the time of the Union Hugh Rose, commissioner for Nairnshire was chosen as one of the Scottish representatives to the first Parliament of Great Britain. From 1708 Nairnshire elected one Member of Parliament to the British House of Commons.

List of shire commissioners
 1617, 1628–1633: John Dunbar of Moynes
 1628–1633, 1630 convention: John Campbell of Calder
 1639–1641: James Grant of Moyness
 1643 convention: Alexander Dunbar of Boath
 1646–1647, 1648: Hugh Rose of Kilravock
 1646–1647, 1648: Alexander Brodie of Lethen
 1661–1663: Sir Hugh Campbell of Calder, sheriff
 1661–63, 1667 convention: James Grant of Moynes 
 1665 convention: Hugh Rose of Clava
 1669–1674, 1678 convention, 1681–82: Sir Hugh Campbell of Calder
 1678 (convention), 1681–1682: Duncan Forbes of Culloden 
 1685–1686: Hugh Rose of Kilravock
 1685–1686, 1689 (convention), 1689–1693: Sir Hugh Campbell of Calder (expelled 1693)
 1689 convention, 1689–1693: John Hay of Lochley  (died c.1693) 
 1689: David Brodie of Lethen
 1693–1702: George Brodie of Aslisk
 1693–1695: Alexander Campbell of Calder (died c.1698) 
 1700–1702, 1702–1707: Hugh Rose of Kilravock
 1702–1703: Duncan Forbes of Culloden (died 1704)
 1704–1707: John Forbes of Culloden

References
 Joseph Foster, Members of Parliament, Scotland, 1882.
 Margaret D. Young, The Parliaments of Scotland: Burgh and Shire Commissioners, 1993. Volume 2, p. 797.

Politics of the county of Nairn
Constituencies of the Parliament of Scotland (to 1707)
Constituencies disestablished in 1707
1707 disestablishments in Scotland